Jerry Louis Page (born January 15, 1961 in Columbus, Ohio) is an American boxer who won the light welterweight gold medal at the 1984 Summer Olympics. A year earlier he won a silver medal at the 1983 Pan American Games.

Amateur career
Jerry Page, an American boxer, was the gold medalist in the 139 lbs classification (light welterweight) at the 1984 Los Angeles Olympics.

1984 Olympic results
 Round of 64: bye
 Round of 32: Defeated Helmut Gertel (West Germany) 5-0
 Round of 16: Defeated Ostavio Robles (Mexico) 5-0
 Quarterfinal: Defeated Kim Dong-Kil (South Korea) 4-1
 Semifinal: Defeated Mirko Puzović (Yugoslavia) 5-0
 Final: Defeated Dhawee Umponmaha (Thailand) 5-0 (won gold medal)

Professional career
Page began his professional career in 1985 and won his first 8 bouts before being beaten in a decision loss to Terrence Alli in 1988. This loss signaled the beginning of an early end for Page, who lost a decision to Frankie Randall in 1989 and then retired in 1990 with a career record of 11-4-0.

References

External links
 
 Jerry Page Boxing and Fitness

1961 births
Living people
African-American boxers
Boxers at the 1983 Pan American Games
Boxers at the 1984 Summer Olympics
Boxers from Columbus, Ohio
Olympic boxers of the United States
Olympic gold medalists for the United States in boxing
American male boxers
Medalists at the 1984 Summer Olympics
Pan American Games silver medalists for the United States
Pan American Games medalists in boxing
Light-welterweight boxers
Medalists at the 1983 Pan American Games
21st-century African-American people
20th-century African-American sportspeople